Lionel Vital (born July 15, 1963) is a former American football running back in the National Football League (NFL) for the Washington Redskins and Buffalo Bills. He was a member of the Calgary Stampeders and Saskatchewan Roughriders in the Canadian Football League (CFL). He also was a scout and director of personnel in the National Football League. He played college football at Nicholls State University.

Early years
Vital attended Loreauville High School, where he practiced football and baseball. He accepted a football scholarship from NCAA Division I-AA Nicholls State University. As a freshman, he was used sparingly as a kickoff returner. As a sophomore, he was a backup at running back.

As a junior in 1983, starter Oscar Smith (second rusher in school history) missed the semester due to an academic suspension, putting Vital in a position to replace him as the starter and set a single-season record with 776 rushing yards.

As a senior, Smith regained his starting position and Vital went back to a backup role. He finished his college career with 1,518 rushing yards and 9 touchdowns.

In 2017, he was inducted into the Nicholls State Athletics Hall of Fame.

Professional career
Vital was selected by the Washington Redskins in the seventh round (185th overall) of the 1985 NFL Draft. He was also selected by the Arizona Outlaws in the 13th round (187th overall) of the 1985 USFL Draft. He was placed on the injured reserve list with a hamstring tear before the start of the season. He was waived on August 19, 1986.

On August 21, 1986, he was claimed off waivers by the New York Giants. He was released when running back Joe Morris ended his contract holdout on August 26.

In September 1986, he was signed as a free agent by the Calgary Stampeders of the Canadian Football League. On October 8, after bouncing between the practice and the active roster, he terminated his practice agreement to play outfield for the Chicago White Sox Instructional League squad.

After the players went on a strike on the third week of the 1987 season, those contests were canceled (reducing the 16 game season to 15) and the NFL decided that the games would be played with replacement players. Vital was signed to be a part of the Redskins replacement team, which was given the mock name "Redscabs" by the media. He was released after the NFL strike ended. He led the replacement games with 346 rushing yards. The rushing yards he registered in the three games, would be the NFL record for most rushing yards per game in a career (115.3) if he had played enough contests. After the strike was over, he was declared inactive from week 7 to week 9. He was cut on November 3.

On December 9, 1987, he was signed as a free agent by the Buffalo Bills. He was declared inactive for the last 3 games of the season. He was released off the injured reserve list on September 19, 1988.

In March 1989, he was signed as a free agent by the Saskatchewan Roughriders of the Canadian Football League. He was a backup running back, while contributing to the team winning the Grey Cup. He was released before the start of the season on July 13, 1990.

Personal life
In 1990, he was hired by the Saskatchewan Roughriders to be a college scout. In 1991, he was originally hired by Bill Belichick to be a college scout for the Cleveland Browns. In 1996, he moved along with the team to Baltimore, to be a scout during the Baltimore Ravens inaugural 1996 season. In 1998, he was hired by the New York Jets as the southeast region scout.

In 2000, he was hired by the New England Patriots as a national scout. In 2001, he was promoted to assistant director of college scouting. In 2005, he was hired as a national scout by the Baltimore Ravens. In 2006, he received the Fritz Pollard Alliance Scouting Award, given to the top African-American scout in each conference.

In 2007, he was hired by the Atlanta Falcons as the assistant director of player personnel, reuniting with general manager Thomas Dimitroff, who was also a part of the Browns and Ravens scouting staffs. In 2011, he was promoted to Associate director of player personnel. In 2013, he was promoted to Director of player personnel. In 2016, he was hired by the Dallas Cowboys as the director of college scouting. In February 2022, he left the Cowboys organization.

In 2018, he received a Super Bowl ring from the Redskins for contributing to the team having a 3-0 record during the strike, winning the NFC East Division, reaching the playoffs and eventually winning Super Bowl XXII.

References

External links
Nicholls State Colonels media guide

1963 births
Living people
People from Iberia Parish, Louisiana
Players of American football from Louisiana
American football running backs
Canadian football running backs
Nicholls Colonels football players
Washington Redskins players
Calgary Stampeders players
Florida Instructional League White Sox players
Buffalo Bills players
Saskatchewan Roughriders players
Cleveland Browns scouts
Baltimore Ravens scouts
New York Jets scouts
New England Patriots scouts
New England Patriots executives
Atlanta Falcons scouts
Atlanta Falcons executives
Dallas Cowboys scouts
Dallas Cowboys executives
National Football League replacement players
Baseball players from Louisiana